The Kitchen Maid is a 1620–1622 painting by Diego Rodríguez de Silva y Velázquez.

The Kitchen Maid may also refer to:

 The Kitchen Maid (Chardin), a 1738 painting by Jean Simeon Chardin
 The Kitchen Maid (Rembrandt), a 1651 painting by Rembrandt

See also 
 Kitchen maid (disambiguation)